Gunnar Normandus Fjord Christensen (8 July 1913 in Copenhagen-7 July 1986 in Odense) was a Danish track athlete, hammer thrower and police officer.  Christensen competed in the 1936 Summer Olympics, representing Denmark in the Men's 200 metres and 400 metres events.

References

External links
 DAF i tal Gunnar Christensen
 Blå Atletikbog for Gunnar Christensen

1913 births
1986 deaths
Danish male hammer throwers
Danish male sprinters
Danish police officers
Athletes from Copenhagen
Athletes (track and field) at the 1936 Summer Olympics
Olympic athletes of Denmark